Xu Jie (born 4 August 1983) is a Chinese Paralympic sitting volleyball player. She is part of the China women's national sitting volleyball team.

She competed at the 2016 Summer Paralympics, winning a silver medal. and 2017 World ParaVolley Women's World Super 6.

See also 
 China at the 2016 Summer Paralympics

References

External links 

 paralympic profile

1983 births
Living people
Volleyball players at the 2016 Summer Paralympics
Paralympic competitors for China
Chinese women's volleyball players
Women's sitting volleyball players
Medalists at the 2016 Summer Paralympics
Chinese sitting volleyball players
Paralympic medalists in volleyball
Paralympic silver medalists for China
21st-century Chinese women